Boreotrachyceras is an extinct genus of ammonite cephalopod, belonging to the order Ceratitida.

The family to which Boreotrachyceras belongs, Trachyceratidae, has more or less involute, highly ornamented shells and ceratitic to ammonitic sutures.

References

Bibliography
 

Trachyceratidae
Triassic ammonites
Carnian genera
Molluscs described in 2012
Prehistoric cephalopod genera
Ceratitida genera